CDS, CDs, Cds, etc. may refer to: cds nuts

Finance
 Canadian Depository for Securities, Canadian post-trade financial services company
 Certificate of deposit (CDs)
 Counterfeit Deterrence System, developed by the Central Bank Counterfeit Deterrence Group
 Credit default swap (CDS), a type of credit derivative

Military
 Chief Defence Scientist, the head of the Australian Defence Science & Technology 
 Chief of the Defence Staff (disambiguation)
 Chief of the Defence Staff (Canada)
 Chief of the Defence Staff (France)
 Chief of the Defence Staff (Ghana)
 Chief of the Defence Staff (India)
 Chief of the Defence Staff (Nigeria)
 Chief of the Defence Staff, of the Republic of Sierra Leone Armed Forces
 Chief of the Defence Staff (Sri Lanka)
 Chief of the Defence Staff (United Kingdom)
 Comprehensive Display System, a command, control, and coordination system used by the British Royal Navy in the 1960s to track aircraft
 South American Defense Council (Consejo de Defensa Sudamericano), of the Union of South American Nations

Organizations
 Canadian Depository for Securities
 Center for Development and Strategy
 Centre de données astronomiques de Strasbourg, a French astronomical data center
 Centre for Development Studies, in India
 Commercial Data Systems, a Canadian software publisher
 Conference of Drama Schools, now part of Drama UK
 Cooperative Development Services, a non-profit organization engaged in cooperative development in the US
 Sinaloa Cartel (Spanish: Cártel de Sinaloa)

Politics
 Campaign for Democratic Socialism, a former group within the British Labour Party; forerunner to the Social Democratic Party
 Centre des démocrates sociaux (Centre of Social Democrats), a French political party; see 
 CDS – People's Party (Centro Democrático e Social – Partido Popular), a Portuguese political party
 Centro Democrático y Social (Democratic and Social Centre), a former Spanish political party
 Convention démocratique et sociale-Rahama (Democratic and Social Convention), a political party in Niger

Science
 Cadmium sulfide (CdS), an inorganic compound
 Climate Data Store, a central component of the Copernicus Climate Change Service (C3S)
 Chromatography data system, software collecting and analyzing chromatographic results
 Coding DNA sequence, that portion of a gene's DNA or RNA, composed of exons, that codes for protein
 Correlated double sampling, a method to measure electrical values such as voltages or currents that allows removing an undesired offset
 Chlorine Dioxide Solution, a toxic solution of sodium chlorite, falsely promoted as a universal cure
Cytosolic DNA Sensor, molecule that detects microbial double-stranded DNA in the cytosol and activates signaling pathways that initiate anti-microbial responses

Technology
 Current Directory Structure, an important internal data structure in DOS
 Compact discs (CDs)
 CD single (CDS), a music single in the form of a standard size compact disc
 Cockpit display system
 Cross-domain solution, processes that transfer data between security domains
 Cinema Digital Sound, a multi-channel surround sound format used for theatrical films in the early 1990s

Other uses
 Common Data Set
 Community day school, a school system used in the state of California, US
 Coulsdon South railway station, London, England (National Rail station code)
 Country Day School movement
 Child-directed speech, or baby talk
 Condensed distillers solubles, also referred to as distillers grains, a cereal byproduct of the distillation process
 Container delivery system, a system used for airdrops
 Controlled/dangerous substance, as defined by the Controlled Substances Act
 Combined Defence Services Examination, abbreviated as CDS, Indian military examination
 Certified Director of Safety (Designation from NATMI - the North American Transportation Management Institute in conjunction with the University of Central Florida)
 Customs Declaration Service, a UK customs management system and planned successor of CHIEF.

See also

 Clinical decision support (CDSS), software to assist clinical diagnostic and therapeutic decision-making
 
 CD (disambiguation), for the singular of CDS